Club Deportivo Laguna, S.A.D. is a Spanish football team based in San Cristóbal de La Laguna, in the Canary Islands. Founded in 1984 it plays in Interinsular Preferente – Group 1, holding home games at Estadio Francisco Peraza, with a capacity of 8,000 seats.

History
Club Deportivo Laguna was founded in 1984 as Asociación Deportiva Laguna, through a merger of various teams from the city, and took the place of CD Estrella in Tercera División.

Club background
AD Laguna (1984–2007)
CD Laguna, SAD (2007–)

Season to season

25 seasons in Tercera División

Famous players
 Ignacio Conte
 Milen Raykov
 Pedri

External links
Official website 
Futbolme team profile 

Football clubs in the Canary Islands
Sport in Tenerife
Association football clubs established in 1984
1984 establishments in Spain